Waman Ch'arpa (Quechua waman falcon or variable hawk, ch'arpa gold nugget, Hispanicized spelling Huamancharpa) is a mountain in the Wansu mountain range in the Andes of Peru, about  high. It is situated in the Apurímac Region, Antabamba Province, Oropesa District. Waman Ch'arpa lies southeast of Q'illu Pachaka.

References 

Mountains of Peru
Mountains of Apurímac Region